Karl Raudsepp Hearne is a film director and screenwriter, whose feature directorial debut Touched premiered on the film festival circuit in 2017 before being released theatrically in 2018.

Raised in Montreal and Dublin, Ireland, he studied at McGill University before pursuing a doctorate at Nanjing University. He later returned to Montreal, where he spent a year studying film at Concordia University.

His short film Song, a Chinese ghost story with dialogue predominantly in Mandarin, received the Prix Fasken-Martineau in 2003, and received a Prix Jutra nomination for Best Short Film at the 5th Jutra Awards.

Following his 2007 short film Stuff, he took some time away from film to help a friend start a business, but found that he was wrapped up in that business for much longer than he had planned to be. When he decided to return to film in the mid-2010s, he quickly secured funding from Telefilm Canada to make Touched.

Touched was nominated for the John Dunning Best First Feature Award at the 7th Canadian Screen Awards in 2019.

Filmography
Lonania (2002)
Song (2002)
Men on a Lake (2006)
Monday Night (2006)
Stuff (2007)
Touched (2017)

References

External links

21st-century Canadian screenwriters
21st-century Canadian male writers
Film directors from Montreal
Writers from Montreal
Concordia University alumni
Living people
McGill University alumni
Nanjing University alumni
Year of birth missing (living people)